Verbesina minuticeps is a species of flowering plant in the family Asteraceae. It is found only in Ecuador. Its natural habitats are subtropical or tropical moist lowland forests and subtropical or tropical dry shrubland. It is threatened by habitat loss.

References

minuticeps
Flora of Ecuador
Endangered plants
Taxonomy articles created by Polbot